Rutger Koppelaar (born 1 May 1993) is a Dutch athlete specialising in the pole vault. He represented his country at the 2019 World Championships in Doha without qualifying for the final. He qualified for the finals at the Europeans (Münich) in 2022 and got a 4th place with a height of 5.75M. 

His personal bests in the event are 5.81 metres outdoors  2022 and 5.75 metres indoors (Apeldoorn 2020).

In 2014 at a meeting in Soest, Germany, Rutger Koppelaar tested positive for Testosterone and was suspended for two years for this.

International competitions

References

External links
Official site

1993 births
Living people
Dutch male pole vaulters
World Athletics Championships athletes for the Netherlands
Dutch sportspeople in doping cases
Doping cases in athletics
Dutch Athletics Championships winners
21st-century Dutch people